The Founders Academy is a charter school in Manchester, New Hampshire, United States. The academy's charter states that the focus is to provide a classical education with a business and law and ethics focus to students in grades five through twelve who reside in the state of New Hampshire.

History
The Founders Academy Foundation presented an application to the New Hampshire State Board of Education on July 18, 2013, seeking to open "The Founders Academy Public Charter School", with the purpose of providing a classical education for students in grades 6 through 12, educating them in good leadership skills.

The foundation's request was approved, and they were allowed to create and open The Founders Academy (TFA). The academy began with grades six through eight, with plans to expand up to twelfth grade. TFA opened for its inaugural year September 2, 2014, with nine staff members and a student body of 100 in grades 6 through 8.

For the 2015-2016 school year, TFA had doubled its staff and student body numbers. The academy has about 300 students in the 2016-2017 school year.

Construction and facilities
The building, a former manufacturing plant located near Manchester–Boston Regional Airport, was refurbished by North Point Construction Management over the summer of 2014 for a cost of $3,705,000. Construction continued throughout the 2014-2015 school year. The land the school resides on is owned by The Founders Academy Foundation.

The  facility includes:

 2 multi-purpose rooms (cafes)
 10 shared faculty offices
 Library (named for its first dean, Maureen Mooney)
 The Founders Academy Foundation Offices
 29 classrooms
 Full Chemistry lab

Curriculum
TFA covers the core subjects of history, English language arts, science, and mathematics. In addition, a fine arts program with classes in band, choir, and visual arts is required for middle schoolers. Every middle school student is also required to take French or Spanish.

Mission statement 
"The Founders Academy is a public chartered school encompassing grades 5 - 12 that is free and open to all New Hampshire students. The Academy develops leaders who understand and apply the lessons of the past, demonstrate exceptional character and lead by example. The Academy recognizes the importance of balance in the development of the whole person and respects each student's journey.

Principled leadership is fostered by means of a curriculum of classical studies that includes analyzing the lives of great men and women of history, mining the rich classical ideals of the Western tradition, and tracing the evolution of the precious and costly idea of liberty."

References

External links
 The Founders Academy Foundation
http://education.nh.gov/instruction/school_improve/charter/documents/founders_7_2013.pdf
http://www.unionleader.com/Charles-Arlinghaus-Charter-schools-provide-character-and-knowledge-to-_tomorrows-leaders

Educational institutions established in 2013
Charter schools in New Hampshire
Schools in Manchester, New Hampshire
Schools in Hillsborough County, New Hampshire
Education in Hillsborough County, New Hampshire
2013 establishments in New Hampshire